Richmond Roger Adongo (born 28 November 1992) is a Ghanaian professional footballer who plays as a forward for Ethiopian club Welwalo Adigrat University FC.

Early life
Richmond Roger Adongo was born in Accra, Ghana. He was spotted at the age of 17 by recruiters from the Swedish club IFK Göteborg. He joined the club and stayed there one season.

After his European experience, he returned to Ghana to continue his professional football career. He was released from Buildcon F.C., after which he joined Ethiopian side Welwalo Adigrat University F.C. in January 2018 on a one-year contract.

Playing career

Club
Youth Career
 2005–2009: Unistar Academy, Ghana
 2009–2010: IFK Göteborg, Sweden

Senior Career
 2010–2011: Liberty Professionals Accra, Ghana (20 match, 13 goals)
 2011–2013: Amidaus Professionals, Ghana (25 match, 11 goals)
 2013–2015: Berekum Chelsea FC, Ghana (19 match, 12 goals)
 2015–2016: Saham Club, Oman (20 match, 10 goals)
 2017: Buildcon F.C., Zambia (26 match, 10 goals)
 2018–present: Welwalo Adigrat University FC, Ethiopia

References

External links
 

1992 births
Living people
Ghanaian footballers
Association football forwards
Berekum Chelsea F.C. players
Saham SC players
Buildcon F.C. players
Ghanaian expatriate footballers
Expatriate footballers in Oman
Expatriate footballers in Zambia
Expatriate footballers in Ethiopia
Liberty Professionals F.C. players
Footballers from Accra